Lone Star Raiders is a 1940 American Western "Three Mesquiteers" B-movie directed by George Sherman.

Cast
 Robert Livingston as Stony Brooke
 Bob Steele as Tucson Smith
 Rufe Davis as Lullaby Joslin
 June Johnson as Linda Cameron
 George Douglas as Henry Martin
 Sarah Padden as Lydia 'Granny' Phelps
 John Elliott as Dad Cameron
 John Merton as Henchman Dixon
 Rex Lease as Henchman Fisher
 Bud Osborne as Ranch hand
 Jack Kirk as Ranch hand
 Tom London as Ranch hand
 Hal Price as Sheriff

See also
Bob Steele filmography

References

External links
 

1940 films
1940 Western (genre) films
American Western (genre) films
1940s English-language films
American black-and-white films
Films directed by George Sherman
Republic Pictures films
Three Mesquiteers films
1940s American films